The 1979 Louisiana Tech Bulldogs football team was an American football team that represented Louisiana Tech University as a member of the Southland Conference during the 1979 NCAA Division I-A football season. In their only year under head coach Larry Beightol, the team compiled a 3–8 record. After going 1–9 through the first ten games of the season, head coach Larry Beightol was fired on November 12. Pat Patterson then served as interim head coach for the final game of the season and led the Bulldogs to a victory over Northeast Louisiana.

Schedule

References

Louisiana Tech
Louisiana Tech Bulldogs football seasons
Louisiana Tech Bulldogs football